João Mendes may refer to:
João Mendes (director) (1919-1997), Portuguese director
João Mendes (footballer, born 1988), Portuguese footballer
João Mendes (footballer, born 1994), Portuguese footballer
João Mendes (footballer, born 2000), Portuguese footballer
João Mendes (footballer, born 2005), Brazilian footballer